Schefflera kuchingensis is a species of plant in the family Araliaceae. It is a tree endemic to Borneo where it is confined to Sarawak.

References

kuchingensis
Endemic flora of Borneo
Trees of Borneo
Flora of Sarawak
Critically endangered plants
Taxonomy articles created by Polbot